James Robert Lemon (March 23, 1928 – May 14, 2006) was an American right and left fielder, manager and coach in Major League Baseball. A powerful, right-handed hitting and throwing outfielder, Lemon teamed with first baseman Roy Sievers and later with slugger Harmon Killebrew and outfielder Bob Allison to form the most formidable home run-hitting tandem in the 60-year history of the first modern-era Washington Senators franchise.

Playing career
He became known as "Jim Lemon" to avoid confusion with Indians' Hall of Fame pitcher Bob Lemon, but he never won a regular job with Cleveland. Instead, Lemon was a "late-bloomer" who required several trips to the minor leagues before finally winning a regular berth with the 1956 Senators at the age of 28. 

A free-swinger who three times led the American League in striking out, Lemon and his teammates benefitted from new Washington owner Calvin Griffith's decision to move the left field fences closer to home plate in the Senators' cavernous ballpark, Griffith Stadium. Lemon smashed 27 homers in 1956, also leading the league in triples, then followed with 26 (1958), 33 (1959) and 38 (1960). He twice compiled over 100 runs batted in and became a favorite of U.S. President Dwight Eisenhower after Eisenhower attended Lemon's 3-home-run performance at Griffith Stadium in 1956.

However, the home run exploits of Lemon and his teammates were more than offset by poor pitching, and after multiple second-division finishes in the AL, Griffith moved the Senators to Minneapolis–Saint Paul after the 1960 campaign to become the Minnesota Twins. But Lemon left his stroke behind in Washington, and after only 14 homers in Minnesota in 1961 and an injury-ruined 1962, his career wound down quickly. His last year as a player, 1963, was divided among the Twins, Philadelphia Phillies and Chicago White Sox. All told, he appeared in 1,010 games over all or parts of 12 major league seasons and batted .262 with 164 home runs.

Coach and manager
Lemon remained in the game as a coach for the Twins, serving two different terms (1965–67; 1981–84) in that role, including with the 1965 pennant-winning team. In between, in 1968, he returned to Washington as manager of the expansion Senators, but his popularity as a player did not translate to a successful managerial record. His club finished last in the ten-team American League, winning 65 games and losing 96 (.404)—but it did feature a fearsome, right-handed power-hitter in Frank Howard. Lemon was fired after only one season, replaced by Ted Williams.

As a native son, and to honor his batting achievements with the original Senators, he was elected to the Virginia Sports Hall of Fame in 1988.

Jim Lemon died from cancer at the age of 78 at his Brandon, Mississippi home.

See also
 List of Major League Baseball annual triples leaders

References

The Baseball Encyclopedia, tenth edition. New York: MacMillan USA, 1996.

External links

Bio from Cool of the Evening: The 1965 Minnesota Twins
Excerpt from a 1953 film following Lemon's progress in spring training

1928 births
2006 deaths
American League All-Stars
Baseball players from Virginia
Bloomingdale Troopers players
Deaths from cancer in Mississippi
Charlotte Hornets (baseball) players
Chattanooga Lookouts players
Chicago White Sox players
Cleveland Indians players
Harrisburg Senators players
Indianapolis Indians players
Major League Baseball first base coaches
Major League Baseball left fielders
Major League Baseball right fielders
Minnesota Twins coaches
Minnesota Twins players
Oklahoma City Indians players
People from Covington, Virginia
People from Brandon, Mississippi
Philadelphia Phillies players
Pittsfield Electrics players
Washington Senators (1901–1960) players
Washington Senators (1961–1971) managers